You Were Never Alone is the sixth studio album by the American rock band Emery, released on May 19, 2015. It is the first album to be released through band's own independent label BadChristian and Rude Records.

Recording, release and promotion
In March 2014, the band released a demo of two new songs.

The album was funded via IndieGoGo crowdfunding campaign and was set to be released in mid-2014 but the release date was later pushed back. In addition to the album, the band was also going to release a music video, a re-recorded version of song "Anne Marie" and an acoustic EP/LP due to the achievement of the "stretch goals" during the crowdfunding project.

Starting with the March 23, 2015 episode of the Break It Down podcast with Matt Carter, Matt Carter, the host of the show and the lead guitarist of Emery, along with guest Toby Morrell, the lead singer of Emery, began a 12 episode series to premier one song from the album for each episode.  Toby and Matt also discussed the process of writing and recording each of the songs on the episode on which it premiered.

On April 28, 2015 the band released a music video for the song "Hard Times".

An instrumental version of You Were Never Alone was released on March 20, 2020.

Track listing
All songs composed by Toby Morrell and Matt Carter

Personnel
Emery
 Toby Morrell – lead vocals, bass, screamed vocals
 Matt Carter – guitar, backing vocals
 Josh Head – keyboard, screamed vocals
 Devin Shelton – vocals
 Dave Powell – drums, percussion
Production
 Beau Burchell – mixing, mastering
 Brett Baird – engineer
 Chad Gardner – arranger
 Troy Glessner	– mastering
 Andrew Nyte – arranger
 Aaron Sprinkle – additional production, engineer
 Alexander C. Sprungle – art direction, design, photography

Meaning and biblical allusions 
In the first twelve episodes of Matt Carter's Break it Down Podcast, he and Toby Morrell went through each song and explained the process of creating them. Then in October 2015, Toby and Matt made another podcast further revealing that the album was a concept album where each song is a story from the bible told in first-person.

Chart performance

References

2015 albums
Emery (band) albums
Albums produced by Aaron Sprinkle
Crowdfunded albums